Stephen John Elkington (born 8 December 1962) is an Australian professional golfer on the PGA Tour Champions. Formerly on the PGA Tour, he spent more than fifty weeks in the top-10 of the Official World Golf Ranking from 1995 to 1998.
Elkington won a major title at the PGA Championship in 1995, and is a two-time winner of The Players Championship.

Early years
Born in Inverell, New South Wales, Elkington grew up in Wagga Wagga. He moved to the United States to attend college in Texas at the University of Houston, where he played on the Cougar golf team that won national titles in 1982, 1984, and 1985. Elkington was the first prominent Australian to play college golf in the U.S., and turned professional in 1985.

Professional career
Elkington was the runner-up at the PGA Tour Qualifying Tournament in December 1986 to earn his tour card for 1987. He had ten victories on the PGA Tour, all in the 1990s, and won four events twice. Elkington had ten top-10 finishes in major championships, with the best results at the PGA Championship; he won in 1995 at Riviera, and a tied for second in 2005 at Baltusrol, behind winner Phil Mickelson, which moved him back into the top 50 in the Official World Golf Ranking. He is a two-time winner of The Players Championship, the PGA Tour's marquee event, with victories in 1991 and 1997. Of the five to win twice at TPC Sawgrass, his span of six years between wins is the shortest.

In addition to his PGA Tour success, Elkington won the 1992 Australian Open and 1996 Honda Invitational on the Asian Tour.

Elkington was a participant in the first four editions of the Presidents Cup, on the International Team in 1994, 1996, 1998, and 2000. In 1995, he was awarded the Vardon Trophy; this award is given annually by the PGA of America to the tour player with the lowest scoring average.

Elkington's career has been hampered by constant battles with allergies, notably to grass, which caused several absences from tournament play. He has had sinus surgeries, constant infections, and bouts with viral meningitis, as well as searing headaches.

As of 2013, Elkington had sponsorship/endorsement deals with apparel brand Oxford Golf, Insperity, World Golf Tour, Grieve Family Winery, and Par West Custom Golf Shoes.

He turned fifty in late 2012 and made his debut on the Champions Tour in June 2013.

Controversies
In June 2006, playing in a sectional to qualify for the U.S. Open, Elkington tried to wear shoes with metal spikes. When his attempt was rebuffed, he left rather than change to soft-spiked shoes, and argued that since spiked shoes were allowed in the U.S. Open, the following week, that they should be allowed at sectional events.

In December 2013, Elkington was widely condemned for remarks he made on Twitter following a fatal helicopter crash in Glasgow's Clutha pub. He wrote: "Helicopter crashes into Scottish pub... Locals report no beer was spilled." The tweet was quickly deleted but not before being shared by users of the social networking site. The comment provoked a furious backlash from his fellow players and commentators alike.

Two months later in February 2014, Elkington tweeted that openly gay football player Michael Sam was "leading the handbag throw" at the NFL Combine, which multiple sources described as  He was suspended by the PGA Tour for two weeks and fined $10,000 after his

Television 
In 2014, RFD-TV began airing The Rural Golfer, starring Elkington. The production followed Elkington as he toured the United States, digging up golf stories. In 2015, CBS Sports Network began airing the second season of the show, retitled Secret Golf with Steve Elkington.

Personal
Elkington met his wife, Lisa, while at the University of Houston, and they have two children. The family has residences in both Australia and the U.S., at Sydney and Houston. His son Sam played golf on his high school team in Houston, and in 2015-2016 was a freshman on the golf team at the University of Houston.

Professional wins (17)

PGA Tour wins (10)

*Note: The 1994 Buick Southern Open was shortened to 54 holes due to rain.

PGA Tour playoff record (4–4)

Asian Tour wins (1)

PGA Tour of Australasia wins (1)

Other wins (5)

Other playoff record (1–0)

Major championships

Wins (1)

1Defeated Montgomerie with birdie on first extra hole.

Results timeline

CUT = missed the half way cut
WD = Withdrew
"T" indicates a tie for a place.

Summary

Most consecutive cuts made – 6 (twice)
Longest streak of top-10s – 2 (twice)

The Players Championship

Wins (2)

Results timeline

CUT = missed the halfway cut
WD = withdrew
"T" indicates a tie for a place.

Results in World Golf Championships

1Cancelled due to 9/11

QF, R16, R32, R64 = Round in which player lost in match play
"T" = Tied
WD = Withdrew
NT = No tournament

Results in senior major championships

CUT = missed the halfway cut
"T" indicates a tie for a place
WD = withdrew

Team appearances
Presidents Cup (International team): 1994, 1996, 1998 (winners), 2000
World Cup (representing Australia): 1994
Alfred Dunhill Cup (representing Australia): 1994, 1995, 1996, 1997, 1998

See also
1986 PGA Tour Qualifying School graduates
List of men's major championships winning golfers

References

External links

Australian male golfers
Houston Cougars men's golfers
PGA Tour golfers
PGA Tour Champions golfers
Winners of men's major golf championships
Sportspeople from Wagga Wagga
Golfers from Houston
Golfers from Sydney
People from Inverell
1962 births
Living people